This is a list of television broadcasters which provide coverage of the Danish Superliga, Danish football's top-level competition.

International broadcasters

Nordic

until 2024

Outside Nordic 

All games can be watched internationally on Bet365 betting platform.

References

Association football on television